Sargon II is a sequel to Sargon. Both are computer chess programs for home computers.

Development
The Spracklens made significant improvements on the original program and released Sargon II. In 1978 it tied for third at the ninth North American Computer Chess Championship despite being seeded ninth of 12 entries. Sargon finished only behind Belle and Chess 4.7, and defeated AWIT—running on a $5 million Amdahl mainframe—amazing the audience. That year they published a series of articles in BYTE on computer chess programming, stating "we think it would be nice if not everyone had to reinvent the wheel".

Sargon II was ported to a variety of personal computers popular in the early 1980s. The game engine featured multiple levels of lookahead to make it more accessible to beginning chess players. BYTE in 1980 estimated that Sargon II had a 1500 rating at the highest tournament-time difficulty level, and speculated that it was the best chess program for sale, including dedicated devices.

Reception
J. Mishcon reviewed The Software Exchange's Sargon II for the TRS-80 and Apple II in The Space Gamer No. 32. Mishcon commented that "This effort stands strongly in the small group of programs that set industry standards. It is a competent computer opponent in the incredibly complex world of chess. Highly recommended for everyone short of the chess master."

BYTE in 1980 stated "buy it. Sargon II is everything Sargon I should have been ... Nearly every deficiency of Sargon has been corrected." The magazine concluded that the game "is about all we computer chess players could wish for". It also favorably reviewed the ROM-cartridge Sargon 2.5, but advised Sargon II owners to "wait for Sargon 3". Ahoy! in 1984 stated that the VIC-20 version of Sargon IIs "chess-playing capability is excellent" and a bargain compared to dedicated chess computers, and gave a similarly favorable review of the Commodore 64 version. The Addison-Wesley Book of Atari Software 1984 gave the game an overall A− rating, stating that only Chess 7.0 was superior on a microcomputer and concluding that it "is a very worthy opponent for any chess enthusiast". Tim Harding in 1985 called Sargon II the first "halfway competent chess program" for home computers. He stated that "in early 1984 the VIC/Sargon II combination was still among the strongest home computer chess programs" despite its age, with "many features superior to today's weaker amateur programs".

Reviews
Moves #56, p29

References

External links
Four games played by Sargon II
Review in 80 Micro
Review in Compute!
Review in Creative Computing
Review in Commodore Microcomputers
Review in ANALOG Computing
Review in InCider

1978 video games
Apple II games
Assembly language software
Atari 8-bit family games
Chess software
Commodore 64 games
CP/M games
TRS-80 games
VIC-20 games
Video games developed in the United States